İbrahim Şâhidî (1470–1550) was a Mawlawi Sufi master and scholar, the author of a famous Persian-Turkish rhymed vocabulary, Tuhfe-i Şâhidî (Gift of Şâhidî), in 1514–15, which was written "for schoolboys and beginning students receiving a Mawlawi education". According to Nile Green, he was "the second major Ottoman focus of Persian learning".

References

Sources
 
 

1470 births
1550 deaths
16th-century writers from the Ottoman Empire
People from Muğla